Ryonggang County is a county in South P'yŏngan province, North Korea.  It is administered as a part of Namp'o Special City. It is famous for its local apples.

Administrative divisions
Ryonggang-gun is divided into one town (ŭp) and 10 villages (ri):

Transportation
Ryonggang County is served by the P'yŏngnam and Ryonggang lines of the Korean State Railway.

See also
Subdivisions of North Korea
Geography of North Korea

External links

Map of Nyongbyon, in Korean

Districts of Nampo
Counties of North Korea